PPCA may refer to:

 Powering Past Coal Alliance
 Pirate Party of Canada
 Primary peritoneal carcinoma
 Phonographic Performance Company of Australia